This is a list of Australian chief justices by time in office.

Chief justices of Australia

See also 
List of justices of the High Court of Australia

Chief Justice, Time In Office
Australia, Chief Justices